Thiri ( Rove) is a 2017 Indian Tamil-language action drama film written and directed by S. Ashok Amritraj, starring Ashwin and Swathi Reddy in the leading roles. Featuring Jayaprakash, A. L. Azhagappan and Karunakaran in supporting roles, the film had a theatrical release on 14 July 2017.

Cast

Ashwin as Jeeva
Swathi Reddy as Swathi
Jayaprakash as Jeeva's father
Anupama Kumar as Jeeva's mother
A. L. Azhagappan as Anganan
Karunakaran as Jeeva's friend
Daniel Annie Pope as Jeeva's friend
Arjai as Kishore
Pandu
Sendrayan
Cheranraj
Prabhu Helen
Vaishali
Agnes
Sonam

Production
The project was officially announced to the media in April 2015, where it was revealed that the film would be a tale on the father-son relationship. The film's debutant director Ashok Amritraj revealed that he had not previously apprenticed under any director and credited his knowledge of film making to purely watching films. While analysing how Tamil films work, Amritraj stated he understood that audiences "love emotional stories" and opted to write a story based on emotions for Thiri. He narrated the script to several young actors in the Tamil film industry, but the script was turned down by many citing the heavy nature of the film's theme until it was accepted by Ashwin. The film was shot throughout late 2015 and 2016 and was prepared for a delayed release in July 2017.

Soundtrack

The film's music was composed by Ajesh and the album released on 17 April 2017 by Trend Music, featuring seven songs. One song in the film, "Dhillirukku Tholodu" was composed by S. Thaman.

Release
The film had a theatrical release on 14 July 2017 and received predominantly negative reviews. Sify.com called the film "a monotonous film" and a "tedious watch", adding "the film is an amateurish masala entertainer highlighting the flaws in the educational system". A critic from The Times of India wrote "The reason Thiri is underwhelming is not because of the predictable script but because it fails to inject fun into it" and that "there are attempts at injecting comedy, alright, but they hardly bring a smile and the film isn't successful in nailing its tone". Likewise, Baradwaj Rangan of Film Companian called the film "a dull, talky, been-there-done-that action-drama".

References

External links
 

2017 films
2010s Tamil-language films
Indian action drama films
2017 action drama films
2017 directorial debut films